The Mrakiaceae are a family of fungi in the order Cystofilobasidiales. Phylogenetic analyses shows that this family is clearly distinct from other yeast-like families of the Tremellomycetes. The family had six genera in 2015.

Genera
As accepted by GBIF and Species Fungorum;
 Itersonilia  (4)
 Krasilnikovozyma  (11)
 Mrakia  (22)
 Phaffia  (1)
 Rhodomyces  (1)
 Tausonia  (5)
 Udeniomyces  (15)
 Vustinia 

Figures in brackets are approx. how many species per family.

References

Tremellomycetes
Mrakiaceae